Ronald E. Brown (born 26 December 1944) is an English retired footballer who played for Blackpool, Plymouth Argyle and Bradford City. He was born in Sunderland.

External links

1944 births
Living people
Footballers from Sunderland
English footballers
English football managers
Blackpool F.C. players
Plymouth Argyle F.C. players
Bradford City A.F.C. players
English Football League players
Peterhead F.C. managers
[[Category:Association football winge